Ben Halls Gap National Park is a national park in New South Wales, Australia, 251 km north of Sydney.

Near the national park are villages like Nundle and Murrurundi and the town of Quirindi.

One of the main features of the park are the extraordinary ancient eucalyptus forests.

See also
 Protected areas of New South Wales

References

National parks of New South Wales
Protected areas established in 1995
1995 establishments in Australia